Andre Begemann and Martin Emmrich were the defending champions, but decided not to participate.

Dustin Brown and Horacio Zeballos claimed the title. They defeated Jordan Kerr and Travis Parrott 6–2, 7–5 in the final.

Seeds

Draw

Draw

References
 Main Draw

AON Open Challenger - Doubles
AON Open Challenger
AON